The 2011 Metro Atlantic Athletic Conference baseball tournament took place from May 24 through 27.  The top four regular season finishers of the league's teams met in the double-elimination tournament held at Mercer County Waterfront Park in Trenton, New Jersey.   won their second tournament championship and earned the conference's automatic bid to the 2011 NCAA Division I baseball tournament.

Seeding
The top four teams were seeded one through four based on their conference winning percentage.  They then played a double-elimination tournament.

Results

All-Tournament Team
The following players were named to the All-Tournament Team.

Most Valuable Player
Mike Giordano was named Tournament Most Valuable Player.  Giordano was a pitcher for Manhattan.

References

Tournament
Metro Atlantic Athletic Conference Baseball Tournament
Metro Atlantic Athletic Conference baseball tournament